Julian Raphael Nathaniel Joseph OBE (born 11 May 1966) is a British jazz pianist, bandleader, composer, arranger, and broadcaster. He has worked solo, in his big band, trio, quartet, forum project band or electric band.

Biography

Joseph was born in London and attended Allfarthing Primary School and Spencer Park Secondary School in Wandsworth. He graduated in composition from Berklee College of Music in 1989.

Joseph works in both contemporary and traditional situations with his music. He is also active in jazz education helping to form the jazz syllabus for the Associated Board of the Royal Schools of Music in Great Britain.
 
Starting with his first album The Language of Truth in 1991, Joseph has six albums, one single, and one soundtrack to his credit, and has focused on live performance, composing, broadcasting and teaching. He performed at the 2003 London Jazz Festival and also hosts several radio shows on BBC Radio 3, including Jazz Line-up and Jazz Legends. He has also made two jazz television series for Meridian, a jazz series for Sky TV's Artsworld Channel and the documentary A Festival of Jazz Piano (2006) for BBC Television in Wales directed by Celia Lowenstein.

In September 2010, Joseph was interviewed by Bruce Lindsay, a jazz critic from All About Jazz, who wrote: "Julian Joseph is something of a jazz master of all trades." October that year, Joseph was presented with a BASCA Gold Badge Award in merit for his unique contribution to music.

Joseph founded the Julian Joseph Jazz Academy in January 2013 in London. The Academy encourages young musicians in the development of jazz technique and understanding. Tutors include Tony Kofi and Byron Wallen.

Joseph is also a trustee and vice-president of the National Youth Jazz Collective.

In the 2018 Queen's Birthday Honours list he was appointed an OBE for services to music.

Discography

As leader/co-leader

Notable albums as sideman

See also
Jazz Warriors

References

External links
 – official site

1966 births
BBC Radio 3 presenters
British jazz pianists
Living people
21st-century pianists
Jazz Warriors members
Officers of the Order of the British Empire